Claudio Daniel Brizuela (born 30 August 1968) is an Argentine football manager and former player who played as a forward. He is the current manager of Bolivian club Palmaflor del Trópico.

Career
Brizuela played for clubs of Argentina, Chile, México, Bolivia, Ecuador, Venezuela and Panamá. After retiring, he worked as a sporting director at Deportivo Merlo during the 2005–06 season, before being a manager of Sportivo Barracas in 2006.

Brizuela was later a youth coordinator at Atlas, and subsequently worked as a sporting manager at Olmedo in 2010. He returned to his home country with Racing Club in the following year, as a technical secretary.

Brizuela left Racing in the end of 2012, and joined San Lorenzo's intake area in the following year. He was also a director of Udinese's project in Argentina in 2014, and worked at Rosario Central in 2015, also in the intake area.

In 2022, after six years at River Plate's intake area, Brizuela joined José Pékerman's staff at the Venezuela national team, as a head scout. In December of that year, he returned to managerial duties after taking over Palmaflor del Trópico in Bolivia.

External links
  
 

1968 births
Living people
Argentine footballers
Association football forwards
Deportivo Morón footballers
Atlante F.C. footballers
Tauro F.C. players
C.D. Jorge Wilstermann players
Deportes Concepción (Chile) footballers
Primera B de Chile players
Chilean Primera División players
Liga MX players
Argentine expatriate footballers
Argentine expatriate sportspeople in Chile
Expatriate footballers in Chile
Argentine expatriate sportspeople in Mexico
Expatriate footballers in Mexico
Argentine expatriate sportspeople in Bolivia
Expatriate footballers in Bolivia
Argentine expatriate sportspeople in Panama
Expatriate footballers in Panama
Argentine expatriate sportspeople in Ecuador
Expatriate footballers in Ecuador
Argentine expatriate sportspeople in Venezuela
Expatriate footballers in Venezuela
Footballers from Buenos Aires
Argentine football managers
C.D. Palmaflor del Trópico managers
Argentine expatriate football managers
Expatriate football managers in Mexico
Expatriate football managers in Bolivia
Club Celaya managers
Mérida UD footballers